I Think We're Alone Now is a 2018 American post-apocalyptic romance drama film directed by Reed Morano, who also acted as cinematographer, and written by Mike Makowsky. It stars Peter Dinklage and Elle Fanning as two survivors who learn to live together after a worldwide pandemic wipes out Earth's population.

The film had its world premiere at the Sundance Film Festival on January 21, 2018. It was released on September 14, 2018, by Momentum Pictures.

Plot
Del lives alone in a small town after an unspecified but sudden (people died where they sat) apocalyptic event has killed off the human population "on a Tuesday afternoon". Believing he is the last man on Earth, Del has set about leading a peaceful existence in his hometown, living in the library where he used to work and spending the day clearing out people's homes and burying the dead.

One night, he is awakened by fireworks. The following day, he discovers a young woman named Grace, unconscious in her car, having gotten into a drunken car accident. Initially, Del is unwelcoming toward the woman, who follows him around and urges him to let her stay. When the woman decides to leave, Del stops her and allows for a theoretical trial period in case they need each other.

Grace is a noisy, erratic presence, but Del reluctantly becomes used to her, feeding her and teaching her his methods for clearing the homes of the dead. When Grace finds a dog, she showers it with love and attention, but after the dog bites Del, he lets it loose and it runs away. When he admits this to Grace, she is furious and reminds him that while he was bitter and alone in his previous life, she was loved and happy. A repentant Del shows her his greenhouse and asks her to continue clearing houses with him.

On one of her trips to search for houses, Grace comes across a house that hasn't been cleared yet and which Del doesn't want to clear. She realizes that it belonged to Del's family. Grace convinces Del to clean the house and bury the body of his mother. Afterwards, Grace informs Del that she has something to tell him but instead avoids addressing the topic directly and kisses him.

The following morning, Del wakes up in the house Grace has been using and is surprised to hear voices downstairs. He meets two new survivors, Patrick and Violet, who introduce themselves as Grace's parents. It is revealed that there were thousands of survivors of the apocalypse, who have formed a community. Because Del has never left his town, he has not been made aware.

Del is upset and leaves but Grace chases him and begs him to keep her with him, saying that the couple are not her real parents and that she was paired with them when she reached the survivor's commune in California. Del ignores her and leaves. Patrick visits Del at the library where he urges Del to come with him, hinting at different experiments occurring in California that focus on the mind.

Soon thereafter, Grace leaves with the couple and Del returns to his solitary lifestyle though he is now wracked with loneliness. No longer capable of living alone, Del abandons his small town and drives to the address Patrick left him, hoping to find Grace. Del sneaks into Grace's home to see her, and while there, sees she has undergone more behavior modification surgery to erase the lingering trauma caused by the loss of her family. While Del and Grace are trying to escape, Patrick attempts to stop them. He explains that the only way for the human race to move forward is to forget the past and what they all lost. Grace panics and shoots him. Violet is not upset as she still remembers her previous life and the daughter she lost, despite the behavior modification she has been subjected to. Del and Grace find the city populated with disconcertingly happy survivors, all blissfully and willfully ignorant of their past trauma. Del and Grace leave the city with no stated or implied goal or destination.

Cast
 Peter Dinklage as Del
 Elle Fanning as Grace
 Paul Giamatti as Patrick
 Charlotte Gainsbourg as Violet

Production
In October 2016, Peter Dinklage and Elle Fanning were attached to star as Del and Grace, respectively. Principal photography was done in New York state, including the towns of Hastings-on-Hudson and Haverstraw.

Soundtrack
Working Man
Written by Geddy Lee & Alex Lifeson
Performed by Rush

Finding My Way
Written by Geddy Lee and Alex Lifeson
Performed by Rush

LA Knights
Performed by Four Step Plan
Courtesy of Four Step Plan

Livin' Proof
Performed by Group Home
Courtesy of Island Records under license from Universal Music Enterprises

Free The Mind
Performed by Johann Johannsson
Courtesy of NTOV

Cuban Jam
Written by La Palabra
Performed by Orquesta La Palabra
Published by Big Tiger Music (BMI)
Courtesy of Light In The Attic Records & Distribution, LLC

Release
The film had its world premiere at the Sundance Film Festival on January 21, 2018, where it won the U.S. Dramatic Special Jury Award for Excellence in Filmmaking. A month later, Momentum Pictures acquired distribution rights to the film. It was released on September 14, 2018.

Critical response
The website's critical consensus reads, "I Think We're Alone Now benefits from an absorbing aesthetic and solid work from its leads, although it's still somewhat less than the sum of its post-apocalyptic parts." Metacritic, which uses a weighted average, assigned a score of 51 out of 100 based on 16 critics, indicating "mixed or average reviews".

Peter Travers of Rolling Stone gave the film 2 stars out of 5, saying, "the emotional investment we make in Del and Grace comes to nothing, as the plot ties up loose ends without a single surprise or a scintilla of genuine emotion." Todd McCarthy of The Hollywood Reporter wrote: "It's hard to figure what induced director Reed Morano, who did such a fine job directing the first three episodes of The Handmaid's Tale last season, to take on such a script, one so devoid of surprise, intriguing notions and compelling scenes." Vikram Murthi of The A.V. Club gave the film a "C" grade, saying, "Morano's film wants to examine the emotional consequences of immersing oneself in trauma, but Makowsky's script merely paws at the edges of the idea rather than diving into the knottiness of it."

References

External links
 

2018 films
American independent films
Films shot in New York (state)
American post-apocalyptic films
2010s science fiction drama films
Films directed by Reed Morano
2018 independent films
2010s English-language films
2010s American films